The Son Seals Blues Band is the debut album by Son Seals, released by Alligator Records in 1973. It was produced by Son Seals and Bruce Iglauer, and was reissued on CD in 1993.

Critical reception
AllMusic called the album "a rough, gruff, no-nonsense affair typified by the decidedly unsentimental track 'Your Love Is like a Cancer'."

Track listing
"Mother-In-Law Blues" – 3:12
"Sitting At My Window" – 4:30
"Look Now, Baby" – 3:24
"Your Love Is Like a Cancer" – 4:30
"All Your Love" – 3:34
"Cotton Picking Blues" – 4:38
"Hot Sauce" – 3:04
"How Could She Leave Me" – 3:39
"Going Home Tomorrow" – 3:37
"Now That I'm Down" – 5:58

References

1973 debut albums
Albums produced by Bruce Iglauer
Alligator Records albums
Blues albums by American artists